Taplitumomab paptox is a mouse monoclonal antibody. The antibody itself, taplitumomab, is linked to the protein PAP, an antiviral from Phytolacca americana, a species of pokeweed. This is reflected by the 'paptox' in the drug's name.

References

Monoclonal antibodies for tumors
Antibody-drug conjugates
Experimental cancer drugs